James Hayes (before 2 April 1676 – 1730/1731) was an English politician. He was a Member of Parliament (MP) for Winchelsea from 1702 to 1708.

Family
Hayes was baptised on 2 April 1676. He was the eldest son of Sir James Hayes and his wife Rachel née Hungerford, daughter of Anthony Hungerford. Rachel was the widow of Henry Carey, 4th Viscount Falkland. This Anthony Carey, 5th Viscount Falkland was Hayes' half-brother. Around April 1709, Hayes married Elizabrth Ashburnham, daughter of John Ashburnham, 1st Baron Ashburnham.

Career
Hayes was educated at Lincoln's Inn.

Death
He died aged approximately 55. He died between the end of March 1730, when he made his will, and the beginning of December 1731.

References

1676 births
1731 deaths
Place of birth missing
People from Winchelsea
Members of Lincoln's Inn
English MPs 1702–1705
English MPs 1705–1707
British MPs 1707–1708
Members of the Parliament of Great Britain for English constituencies